William Klika Jr. (born June 28, 1945) is a former American football and baseball coach and college athletics administrator.  He  was the first head football coach at Fairleigh Dickinson University–Florham (FDU) in Florham Park, New Jersey. An NCAA Division III program, FDU began its football program in 1974 and hired then 27-year-old Klika as its first coach. Klika remained in charge of the program from 1974 through 1996, took a three-year hiatus to serve as FDU's full-time athletic director, and then returned for two final seasons in 2000 and 2001. He compiled an overall record of 66–155–1.

Head coaching record

Football

References

1945 births
Living people
Fairleigh Dickinson–Florham Devils athletic directors
Fairleigh Dickinson–Florham Devils baseball coaches
Fairleigh Dickinson–Florham Devils football coaches